The Simley High School wrestling team, located in Inver Grove Heights, Minnesota, ranked nationally in the top twenty-five for seven of the last ten years. The Scholastic wrestling program was founded by teacher Jim Short. The program secured its first place state title within seven years. The following year, in 1978, Jim Trudeau won the school's first individual state title. In 1987, the team earned its first state championship.

Coaches
Jim Short ran the program from its inception in 1970 until 1998, when his son, Will Short, a former All-American wrestler at the University of Minnesota, replaced him. Jim returned as an Assistant Coach in 2009. The two were named "Co-head Coaches of the Year" for the 2009-10 season. In 1990, Jim was named to the Minnesota wrestling Hall of Fame. Several college wrestlers joined the Shorts to complete the staff.
 Brett Lawrence - Former All-American at the University of Minnesota
 Tim Hartung - Former 3x All-American and 2x national champion at the University of Minnesota
 Cole Konrad - Former 4x All-American and 2x national champion at the University of Minnesota
 Mark Madigan - 2012 Minnesota and National assistant coach of the year
 Dan Glenn -  Former 3x All-American at the University of Iowa

State Tournament

Team
16-time Minnesota State Tournament Entrant
11-time Minnesota State Champion, in 1987, 1988, 1989, 1992, 2008, 2009, 2010, 2011 & 2012, 2014, 2015
6-time Minnesota State Runner-Up, in 1991, 1994, 1995, 2003, 2005 & 2013
 2-time State Third Place, 1993 & 2002

Individual 

 40 - Champions
 34 - Runners-up
 19 - 3rd Place
 21 - 4th Place
 19 - 5th Place
 14 - 6th Place

Winners

References

External links
 
 The Guillotine, Minnesota Wrestling 
 Inver Grove Heights Community Schools, ISD 199

Scholastic wrestling